Pedee Branch is a stream in Monroe County in the U.S. state of Missouri. It is a tributary of Flat Creek.

Pedee Branch most likely derives its name from an unidentified Native American language.

See also
List of rivers of Missouri

References

Rivers of Monroe County, Missouri
Rivers of Missouri